Sibișel may refer to the following places in Romania:

 , a village in Beriu Commune, Hunedoara County
 Sibișel, a village in Râu de Mori Commune, Hunedoara County
 Sibișel, another name for the river Valea Caselor in Sibiu County
 Sibișel (Orăștie), a tributary of the river Orăștie in Hunedoara County
 Sibișel (Strei), a tributary of the river Râul Mare in Hunedoara County

See also
 Sebeș (disambiguation)